Southern Naval Base (Russian: Южная военно-морская база) was a naval base of the Armed Forces of Ukraine located in the town of Novoozerne (part of Yevpatoria city municipality) at the Donuzlav Bay in the western part of Crimea.

The base was reorganized in place of the Crimea Naval Base of the Soviet Union which completely occupyied the southern shores of Donuzlav Bay and included hovercraft berths, Donuzlav Air Station, and a submarine base. Most of the former base is disassembled, while the former Donuzlav Air Station is non-operational.

Donuzlav Bay is separated from the Black Sea by two sandspits which serve as a small freight port of the Yevpatoriya Commercial Trade Port located in the city.

History
The naval base was established by Ukraine in 1996, having previously been a Soviet naval base from 1976 to 1991, and then a Russian base. It  celebrated its 15th anniversary in 2011.

Capture by Russia

In connection with the events of social and political instability that led the Ukraine government to resignation on 28 January 2014, Russian parliament authorized the deployment of Russian military troops on Ukrainian soil with the official mandate of protection for Russian native population living in Crimea. These actions violated the treaties of 1997 and are qualified as an act of aggression according to Article 3(e) of United Nations General Assembly Resolution 3314 (XXIX) on the Definition of Aggression of 1974:
The use of armed forces of one State which are within the territory of another State with the agreement of the receiving State, in contravention of the conditions provided for in the agreement or any extension of their presence in such territory beyond the termination of the agreement.

Naval blockade
During the night between 5 and 6 March 2014 ships of the Russian Black Sea Fleet, led by the Slava-class cruiser Moskva sank the decommissioned Russian Kara-class cruiser Ochakov and the rescue tugboat Shakhter at the entrance to Donuzlav Bay as blockships to prevent the Ukrainian fleet stationed at the Southern Naval Base from reaching the open sea. The following day the decommissioned diving support vessel BM-416 was also scuttled in the bay entrance. Trapped in the bay, the Ukrainian squadron surrendered without a shot being fired. The Ochakov was refloated several months later, and returned to Inkerman to await scrapping.

References

External links
 Members of the Southern Naval Base of Ukrainian Navy celebrated 15th anniversary of establishing of Ukrainian Navy
 Members of the Southern Naval Base of Ukrainian Navy celebrated 15th anniversary of establishing of Ukrainian Navy. Ministry of Defense.
 Historical outlook. Novoozerne town website.

Ukraine Navy facilities
Military facilities in Crimea
Yevpatoria Municipality
1996 establishments in Ukraine
2014 disestablishments in Ukraine
Military installations closed in 2014